Telergy is a progressive metal/rock music project based in New Hampshire, United States, formed by singer and multi-instrumentalist Robert McClung in 2009. Telergy has had a number of well-known guest musicians, such as Dee Snider, Joe Hoekstra, Trent Gardner, Colin Edwin, Nik Turner, and many more.

History 
In 2009, McClung came up with an idea that he could tell a story about an historical event through classically inspired music.

In 2011, The Exodus was released, a story about the age-old biblical tale told through music.

In 2013, Legend of Goody Cole was released, telling the story of Eunice Goody Cole, "Hampton's most prominent witch".

Members

Actual members 
Dee Snider - voice, guitar (2009–present)
Vernon Reid - guitar (2018–present)  
Oliver Palotai - keyboard (2016–present) 
David Ragsdale - violin (2015–present)
Pete Trewavas - bass (2015–present)
Todd Sucherman - drum (2019–present)

Past members 
Joel Hoekstra - guitar (2012-2015)
Trent Gardner - keyboard (2009-2016)
Valerie Vigoda - violin (2009-2015)
Colin Edwin - guitar (2015-2018)
Nik Turner - bass (2009-2015)
Chris Bonito - drum (2009-2019)

Discography 
 2011 - Exodus
 2013 - Legend of Goody Cole
 2015 - Hypatia
 2020 - Black Swallow

References 

Rock music groups from New Hampshire
American progressive rock groups